Mostafa Izadi is an Iranian senior military officer in the Revolutionary Guards with the rank of Major general. He is a former commander of the IRGC's Ground Force.

As of 2015, he served as the Deputy Chief of Staff of the Iranian Armed Forces for Logistics.

See also 
 List of Iranian two-star generals since 1979

References 

Living people
People from Najafabad
Islamic Revolutionary Guard Corps personnel of the Iran–Iraq War
Islamic Revolutionary Guard Corps major generals
Year of birth missing (living people)